The 2023 Nigerian presidential election in Kwara State was held on 25 February 2023 as part of the nationwide 2023 Nigerian presidential election to elect the president and vice president of Nigeria. Other federal elections, including elections to the House of Representatives and the Senate, will also be held on the same date while state elections will be held two weeks afterward on 11 March.

Background
Kwara State is a large state in the North Central with a growing economy and vast natural areas but facing agricultural underdevelopment, deforestation, and insecurity. The state's 2019 elections had a large swing towards the state APC. Although the APC had won most 2015 elections in Kwara, the vast majority of APC officeholders left the party in 2018 to follow Senator Bukola Saraki into the PDP; despite the Saraki dynasty's longstanding control over Kwaran politics, the APC-led Ó Tó Gẹ́ movement swept the state in 2019. The APC won all three senate seats back and in the process, defeated Saraki by a wide margin. Similarly, the APC gained five PDP-held House seats to sweep all House of Representatives elections. On the state level, the APC gained the governorship and all but one seat in the House of Assembly. These results, coupled with presidential incumbent Muhammadu Buhari (APC) winning the state with nearly 70%, led to the categorization of the 2019 elections as a seismic shift in the state's politics.

Polling

Projections

General election

Results

By senatorial district 
The results of the election by senatorial district.

By federal constituency
The results of the election by federal constituency.

By local government area 
The results of the election by local government area.

See also 
 2023 Kwara State elections
 2023 Nigerian presidential election

Notes

References 

Kwara State gubernatorial election
2023 Kwara State elections
Kwara